Craig Ranch may refer to:

 Craig Ranch Regional Park, a regional park in North Las Vegas, Nevada, United States
 Craig Ranch Station, a cancelled hotel and casino in North Las Vegas, Nevada, United States
 TPC Craig Ranch, a private golf club in McKinney, Texas, United States

See also
 Craig (disambiguation)